The Sotha Vilaibeach is among the most important beaches in the district of Kanyakumari, Tamil Nadu. The beach here stretches over 4 km which makes it one of the longest beaches in Tamil Nadu. It was also one of the most seriously affected areas of the district during the 2004 Tsunami.

References

Kanyakumari district